HMT Lord Hailsham (FY109) was a Royal Navy vessel that saw service in the Second World War. The ship was named after Douglas Hogg, 1st Viscount Hailsham.

Service history
Lord Hailsham was a trawler converted to be used in anti-submarine warfare. She had a  gun forward and 20 mm Oerlikon machine guns on the wings of the bridge, which could be used for anti-aircraft and anti-ship actions. She was also equipped with ASDIC anti-submarine sonar detection equipment, and carried up to 14 depth charges. Later on, she was equipped with a Holman Projector.

A crest of the Hailsham Family was given to the ship in 1942 at the request of First Lieutenant Reginald Mortimore, and was displayed on the front of the ship's bridge.

The ship saw action in the English Channel, and the Eastern Atlantic.

Fate
Lord Hailsham was on convoy duty when she was sunk on 27 February 1943 in Lyme Bay by German E-boats. At the time she was one of five armed ships, led by the Hunt Class destroyer HMS Blencathra, escorting a convoy of eight merchant vessels from South Wales to Southampton. Four of the merchant ships were also lost in the action.

One of her crew, Seaman James Robert Beatty (Royal Naval Reserve), was Mentioned in Despatches due to his prompt action which helped to save lives when the ship was hit.

References

External links
Lord Hailsham at uboat.net

Anti-submarine trawlers of the Royal Navy
World War II naval ships of the United Kingdom
Ships built in Selby
Maritime incidents in February 1943